Lini Evans is a Canadian singer and actress. She starred alongside Lacey Chabert in the television movie "The Tree That Saved Christmas" which became the highest rated Up original movie of all-time and was directed by David Winning.

Evans was featured singing her own Japanese version of “The End of the World” in Season One of the Amazon Prime series The Man in the High Castle. Episode 8 was named after this song and directed by Karyn Kusama. 

Among numerous roles on film & TV, she played Alan Thicke's fiancée in Stop the Wedding, Nicola Peltz's mother Amelia Martin on Bates Motel, and Debra Harper on Supernatural. She has reprised roles for several successful TV movies.

Residing in Vancouver, B.C. and performing worldwide, Calgary-born Evans sings in eight languages: English, Cantonese, Mandarin, Japanese, French, Spanish, Tagalog, and Vietnamese. She has performed for Chinese Premier Zhu Rongji, Japanese royalty in Kobe, and in Mandarin with Han Lei for the finale duet of the Our Chinese Heart concert at Rogers Arena. Throughout her career, she has performed with well-known Asian celebrities including Dashan, Andy Lau, and A-Mei.

Filmography

References

External links
Official website

Canadian television actresses
Canadian film actresses
Actresses from Vancouver
Canadian women singers
Canadian voice actresses
Actresses from Calgary
Living people
Musicians from Calgary
Musicians from Vancouver
Year of birth missing (living people)